Leslie Charleson (born February 22, 1945) is an American actress, best known for her role as Monica Quartermaine in the ABC daytime soap opera General Hospital.

Life and career
Charleson was born in Kansas City, Missouri. Actress Kate Charleson was her sister. Her career began on short-lived ABC daytime soap opera A Flame in the Wind in 1964. In 1966 she joined the cast of As the World Turns. From 1967 to 1970, she starred on the CBS soap opera Love Is a Many Splendored Thing. She played the role of Iris Donnelly Garrison. Her character was a part of a highly popular love triangle with David Birney and Donna Mills.

In 1968, she played the role of a doctor's daughter in the Wild Wild West in the episode "The Night of Fire and Brimstone". She guest-starred on many series from 1970 to 1977, including Adam-12; Emergency!; Ironside; Mannix;   Marcus Welby, M.D.; Happy Days; Cannon; The Streets of San Francisco; and The Rockford Files. She had a supporting role in the 1973 science-fiction film The Day of the Dolphin and co-starred opposite Shelley Winters in the television thriller Revenge! (1971). Charleson also had leading roles in a number of unsuccessful television pilots.

On August 16, 1977, Charleson returned to daytime television with the role of Monica Quartermaine in the ABC soap opera General Hospital. Fred Silverman, then president of ABC, asked her to join the series, which at that time was near the bottom of the ratings and near cancellation. Charleson replaced Patsy Rahn as Monica, a doctor caught between her husband Jeff Webber and his back-from-the-dead brother, her true love Rick Webber. For her long-running performance on the show, she was nominated for a Daytime Emmy Award for Outstanding Lead Actress in a Drama Series four times. On August 24, 2010, it was announced that Charleson was being demoted to recurring status. Charleson is currently the longest-serving cast member of General Hospital.

Filmography

References

External links

1945 births
Living people
Actresses from Kansas City, Missouri
American soap opera actresses
American television actresses
20th-century American actresses
21st-century American actresses